is a railway station on the Sasshō Line in Kita-ku, Sapporo, Hokkaido, Japan, operated by the Hokkaido Railway Company (JR Hokkaido). The station is numbered G11.

Lines

Station layout
The station has two side platforms serving two tracks on the otherwise single-track section of the line east of Ainosato-Kyōikudai Station. The station has automated ticket machines and Kitaca card readers. The station is unattended.

History

See also
 List of railway stations in Japan

References

Railway stations in Sapporo
Stations of Hokkaido Railway Company
Kita-ku, Sapporo
Railway stations in Japan opened in 1958